Ahmadabad (also Romanized as Aḩmadābād) is a village in Keshavarz Rural District of Keshavarz District of Shahin Dezh County, West Azerbaijan province, Iran. At the 2006 National Census, its population was 1,717 in 405 households. The following census in 2011 counted 1,772 people in 520 households. The latest census in 2016 showed a population of 1,639 people in 504 households; it was the largest village in its rural district.

References 

Shahin Dezh County

Populated places in West Azerbaijan Province

Populated places in Shahin Dezh County